Zhang Tingting (born 3 September 1996) is a Chinese handball player for Anhui and the Chinese national team.

She participated at the 2017 World Women's Handball Championship.

References

1996 births
Living people
Chinese female handball players
Handball players at the 2014 Summer Youth Olympics